Antoni Wieczorek (8 May 1924 in Szczyrk - 16 August 1992 in Zlaté Moravce) was a Polish ski jumper who competed from 1952 to 1962. He finished 24th in the individual large hill at the 1952 Winter Olympics in Oslo. Wieczorek's best career finish was 5th place in an individual normal hill event in Austria in 1961.

References

1924 births
1992 deaths
Polish male ski jumpers
Olympic ski jumpers of Poland
Ski jumpers at the 1952 Winter Olympics
People from Bielsko County
Sportspeople from Silesian Voivodeship
20th-century Polish people